The Central and Western District located on northwestern part of Hong Kong Island is one of the 18 administrative districts of Hong Kong. It had a population of 243,266 in 2016. The district has the most educated residents with the second highest income and the third lowest population due to its relatively small size.

Central is the central business district and the core urban area of Hong Kong. Western District covers Shek Tong Tsui, Kennedy Town, Sai Ying Pun, parts of Lung Fu Shan. The district was part of City of Victoria, the earliest urban settlement in colonial Hong Kong.

History
Central District, as Victoria City, was the first area of planned urban development in Hong Kong during the colonial era. The British held a land sale in June 1841, six months after the flag was raised at Possession Point. A total of 51 lots of land were sold to 23 merchant houses to build offices and warehouses. The property buyers included Dent's, Jardine's, Russell's and Olyphant's. At the time, the two roads Albany Nullah (now Garden Road) and Glenealy Nullah (now Glenealy) were mainly used by the British. The streets later became known as Government Hill.

In 1857, the British government expanded Victoria City and divided it into seven districts. Those located in present-day Central and Western are: Sai Ying Pun, Sheung Wan, Tai Ping Shan, Central. The area was essentially a European area until 1860 when Chinese merchants begin buying up European properties around Cochrane, Wellington and Pottinger Streets. The Central district was the principal European business district, hence the arrival of the first major bank HSBC. The Western district was the commercial centre for Chinese businesses. When property values in the district rose, a meeting was held in February 1866 to establish a "District Watch Force" to police and protect this specific area.

In 1880, Shek Tong Tsui was established, followed by Kennedy Town in the 20th century. By the 1890s the majority of Hong Kong's population was concentrated in the district with about 200,000 residents, mostly in Victoria City.

Politics

District councils in Hong Kong are primarily consultative bodies of the HKSAR government with very limited powers, primarily restricted to building and maintaining parks, open areas, recreational and cultural activities and tourist promotion. The corresponding body for the district is Central and Western District Council.

District council elections are held every four years; the last one was held on 24 November 2019, for terms beginning 1 January 2020. Fifteen constituency members are elected while four are appointed by the government. The constituency areas are smaller than the commonly used geographic areas, which are in turn based on the old 1857 and 1880 divisions.

Demographics

In Hong Kong's 2011 Census the district population was 251,519, down four percent from 261,884 in the 2001 census, and with an average of 2.7 people for each of the 89,529 households. Among the 18 districts, Central and Western has the second highest median household income in the territory (behind only Wan Chai District). In terms of average size of households, it is third smallest at 2.8 persons, behind only Wan Chai and Yau Tsim Mong District, at 2.7 each.

In 2016 census, the district population was slightly reduced to 243,266 or down 3% from 2011.

Central and Western District has a relatively ethnically diverse population. 83% of the district's residents are Chinese, and the largest ethnic groups are Filipinos (6%) and white people (5%). 72% of the district's residents speak Cantonese as their primary language, while 14% use English and 3% use Mandarin.

Geography and political subdivisions
It is surrounded by Wan Chai District on the east, Southern District on the south, and Victoria harbour in the north. The district also encompasses Green Island and Little Green Island, two uninhabited islands to the west of Hong Kong Island.

Areas from west to east along Victoria Harbour are: Kennedy Town, Sai Ying Pun, Sheung Wan, Central, Admiralty and other localities.

Central

Central is the business centre of Hong Kong, and many multinational financial services corporations have their headquarters there. Government Hill, the site of the government headquarters, is also in Central.

Central mid-levels escalator

The Central-Mid-Levels escalator in Hong Kong is the longest outdoor covered escalator system in the world.

The escalator runs downhill from 6 am to 10 am and uphill from 10:20 am to 12:00 am (midnight) every day. Apart from its significance in transport linkage, it is also a tourist attraction, with many restaurants, bars, and shops lining its route.

Bank of China Tower

The Bank of China Tower in Central houses the headquarters of BOCHK. Construction began in 1985 and the building was completed in 1989. It was the first building outside the United States to exceed  and to exceed . It was the tallest building in Hong Kong and Asia from 1989 to 1992, when the nearby, taller Central Plaza was completed.

City Hall

Built in 1962, the City Hall complex housed the old central library of Hong Kong, as well as concert halls, restaurants and a marriage registry. The conference room of the former Urban Council was also at the lower building of the City Hall.

The garden at the north-western side of the complex includes a memorial to those killed in Hong Kong during World War II.

Chinese People's Liberation Army Forces Hong Kong Building 
The funnel-shaped Chinese People's Liberation Army Forces Hong Kong Building (formerly, and still commonly known as the Prince of Wales Building) housed the headquarters of the British garrison in Hong Kong until the territory's handover to the People's Republic of China on 30 June 1997. It now houses the local garrison of the People's Liberation Army and is formally known as Central Barracks, in line with PLA convention for naming barracks after the name of the locality.

Other landmarks 

 Cenotaph, Hong Kong
 Chater Garden
 Chinese People's Liberation Army Forces Hong Kong Building (formerly the Prince of Wales Building)
 Edinburgh Place, Hong Kong – including Queen's Pier and the Star Ferry pier
 Exchange Square
 Former Supreme Court Building
 Harcourt Garden
 Hong Kong Zoological and Botanical Gardens
 Hong Kong Club
 Hong Kong Park
 HSBC Hong Kong headquarters building
 International Finance Centre
 Jardine House
 Lan Kwai Fong
 Legislative Council building
 Lippo Centre
 Old Bank of China Building
 Peak Tram terminus
 St John's Cathedral (Hong Kong)
 St Joseph's College, Hong Kong
 St. Paul's Co-educational College
 SoHo, Hong Kong
 Statue Square

Admiralty 
 Queensway

Mid-Levels

 Government House

Sai Ying Pun
 Sai Ying Pun Community Complex

Sheung Wan
 The Center

Schools

Secondary schools
Arranged by alphabetical order of their full names in each category.

Government-administered schools:
 King's College

Aided schools:
 Lok Sin Tong Leung Kau Kui College
 Raimondi College
 St. Clare's Girls' School
 St. Joseph's College
 St. Louis School
 St. Stephen's Church College
 St. Stephen's Girls' College
 Ying Wa Girls' School

Schools under Direct Subsidy Scheme (DSS):
 St. Paul's Co-educational College
 St. Paul's College

International schools:
 German Swiss International School
 Island School  (under funding of English Schools Foundation, subsidised by government)

Tertiary institutions
 The University of Hong Kong
 Caritas Institute of Higher Education

Transport

Link
 Route 3 (Hong Kong)
 Route 4 (Hong Kong)

Major roads that serves the area include:
 Harcourt Road
 Connaught Road Central, Connaught Road West
 Queensway, Queen's Road Central, Queen's Road West
 Des Voeux Road Central, Des Voeux Road West
 Hill Road Flyover
 Caine Road
 Robinson Road
 Park Road
 Bonham Road
 Western Harbour Crossing

Public transport
Public transport includes Hong Kong Tramways, the Peak Tram and the MTR.

MTR lines include:
Island line: Sheung Wan station, Central station, Admiralty station, Sai Ying Pun, HKU, Kennedy Town
Tsuen Wan line: Central station, Admiralty station
Tung Chung line: Hong Kong station
Airport Express: Hong Kong station
South Island line: Admiralty station
East Rail line: Admiralty station

See also

 List of places in Hong Kong
 Tourism in Hong Kong

References

External links

 Central and Western District Council
 List and map of electoral constituencies (large PDF file)
 Coordinates are courtesy of the GNS system of the National Imagery and Mapping Agency.